Şehzade Bayezid  was an Ottoman prince and son of Sultan Ahmed I.

Life
He was born to Ahmed I. He may have been the theorized second child of Mahfiruz Hatun, already mother of Osman II, or he may have been the son of an unknown concubine. He was a few months younger than his half-brother Şehzade Murad (future sultan Murad IV). When Ahmed died on 22 November 1617, he was placed in the Kafes with his half brothers Mehmed, Murad, Selim, Suleiman, Kasim and Ibrahim in unknown period during the reign of his uncle sultan Mustafa I and half brother Osman II. After Mustafa was deposed and replaced by Osman, his half-brother Mehmed was executed under the orders of Osman one year before being murdered by his enemies, which brought Mustafa once again to the throne. After Mustafa was deposed for a second time, Bayezid's half-brother Murad was placed in the throne before him due to been older by a few months. However, on 27 July 1635, he was executed along with his half-brother Suleiman and Selim. The orders were carried out by Murad, because he had reason to believe that the Janissaries were about to rebel to overthrow him.

Death
He was murdered under the orders of Murad, on 27 July 1635, in Topkapı Palace due to some rumors that Murad's enemies wanted Bayezid in throne. He was buried in the Ahmed I Mausoleum, Sultan Ahmed Mosque.

In literature and popular culture
 Jean Racine wrote a play called Bajazet which was based on the life of Şehzade who was preferred on the throne over the existing sultan his brother Murad IV.
 Şehzade Bayezid is portrayed by Yiğit Uçan In 2015 Turkish historical non-fiction TV series Muhteşem Yüzyıl: Kösem. In the series he is the son of a fictional concubine named Gülbahar Sultan, and his death does not match the historical one, although he is still executed by Murad IV.

References 

1612 births
1635 deaths
17th-century Ottoman royalty
Ottoman princes